Caley Reece (née Lewis; born 23 November 1979) is a retired Australian Muay Thai kickboxer who competed in the featherweight and lightweight divisions. A successful competitor at both amateur and professional levels, Reece came to prominence by winning state and national titles in her native Australia before going on to take six World Championships. Reece won a silver medal at the 2010 World Combat Games. She holds a notable victory over current Lion Fight Featherweight Champion and Glory Super Bantamweight Champion Tiffany van Soest.

Early life
Caley Reece practiced Zen Do Kai for a number of years, achieving the rank of brown belt. Prior to her Muay Thai career, she was manager of a health clinic.

Career
Reece had her first fight at the age of 25. Despite losing her first two fights, she would then embark on a lengthy winning streak and win the WMC Western Australia state and Australian national featherweight (-57.1 kg/126 lb) titles as well as the WKA Australian welterweight (-55 kg/122 lb) strap at amateur level. Turning professional in 2009, she captured the WPMF Women's World Featherweight (-57.1 kg/126 lb) Championship in her pro debut when she defeated Sindy Huyer via unanimous decision at Domination 3 in her home town of Perth on 5 September 2009. At the King's Birthday 2009 event in Bangkok, Thailand on 5 December 2009, she outpointed Jessica Sanchez to take the WMC Women's Intercontinental Featherweight Championship. She retained this belt with a unanimous decision victory over Jessica Gladstone at Supremacy 10: Talk is Cheap in Perth on 19 June 2010.

She returned to the amateur ranks to represent Australia in the women's -60 kg/132 lb Muay Thai division at the 2010 World Combat Games, which was held in Beijing, China between 28 August – 4 September 2010. A silver medalist, Reece defeated Alena Muratava by split decision in the quarter-finals and Aicha El Majydy by unanimous decision in the semis before losing a UD to Valentina Shevchenko in the final. Reece then also participated in the 2010 IFMA World Championships in Bangkok in December 2010 where she beat Kristina Alvarez on points in the quarter-finals prior to withdrawing from the competition.

Caley Reece was scheduled to fight Alla Ivashkevich for the vacant WMC Women's World Featherweight Championship at Epic 2: Honour in Perth on 19 March 2011. However, the Belarusian withdrew due to injury nine days before the fight and was replaced by Nong Tran Detract in a non-title match. Reece defeated the Thai by decision. She eventually got her chance to challenge for the belt at Epic 3: Believe on 25 June 2011 against Madeleine Vall, winning a decision to become the new champion.

Following this, Reece's next four fights came in Thailand where she recorded notable defeats of Ayadet Sor Sawaddee at the Queen's Cup 2011 in August 2011 and Magdalena Rak at the WMC Grand Prix on 3 April 2012. Later that month, she became the first woman to win two WMC titles in two different weight divisions when she beat Anna Willberg for the WMC Women's World Junior Lightweight (-58.9 kg/130 lb) Championship.

On 13 October 2012, Caley Reece made the first and only defence of her WMC featherweight title when she beat Meryem Uslu by unanimous decision at Epic 7: Staunch. She subsequently retired after the fight. Her retirement was brief, however, as eight months later, on 20 June 2013, she took a decision win over Patricia Silva at Epic 9: Hectic in her comeback fight.

Caley Reece became a four time world champion when she took the Lion Fight Women's Featherweight (-56.7 kg/125 lb) Championship from Tiffany van Soest in the Lion Fight 13 headliner on 7 February 2014 in Las Vegas, Nevada, United States. Although it was a close fight, Reece's use of the clinch and sweeps saw her take a split decision and hand van Soest her first professional defeat. She was then expected to face Sawsing Sor Sopit at Epic 10: Pressure in Perth on 15 March 2014 but Sawsing was replaced by Chommanee Taehiran. Reece defeated Chommanee by decision to retain her WMC world featherweight title. On 29 March 2015 she announced her retirement on her Facebook page.

Personal life
She married her trainer Darren Reece in 2011.

Championships and awards

Kickboxing
AwakeningFighters.com
2014 Personality of the Year
International Kickboxer
2012 Female Fighter of the Year
Lion Fight
Lion Fight Women's Featherweight (-56.7 kg/125 lb) Championship (One time)
Pimp Juice Cup
Pimp Juice Cup Tournament Championship
World Combat Games
2010 World Combat Games -60 kg/132 lb Muay Thai Silver Medalist 
World Kickboxing Association
WKA Amateur Women's Australian Welterweight (-55 kg/122 lb) Muay Thai Championship (One time)
World Muaythai Council
WMC Amateur Women's Western Australia Featherweight (-57.1 kg/126 lb) Championship (One time)
WMC Amateur Women's Australian Featherweight (-57.1 kg/126 lb) Championship (One time)
WMC Women's Intercontinental Featherweight (-57.1 kg/126 lb) Championship (One time)
One successful title defence
WMC Women's World Featherweight (-57.1 kg/126 lb) Championship (One time)
Two successful title defences
WMC Women's World Junior Lightweight (-58.9 kg/130 lb) Championship (One time)
World Professional Muaythai Federation
WPMF Women's World Featherweight (-57.1 kg/126 lb) Championship (One time)

Kickboxing record

See also
 List of female kickboxers

References

External links
 Caley Reece at Awakening Fighters
 Facebook Athlete Page

1979 births
Living people
Australian female kickboxers
Featherweight kickboxers
Lightweight kickboxers
Australian female karateka
Australian Muay Thai practitioners
Female Muay Thai practitioners
Sportswomen from Western Australia
Sportspeople from Perth, Western Australia